Pablo Cuevas was the defending champion but chose not to compete.

Máximo González won the tournament defeating Jozef Kovalík in the final, 6–1, 6–3.

Seeds

  Paolo Lorenzi (semifinals, retired)
  Facundo Bagnis (first round)
  Guido Pella (first round)
  Máximo González (champion)
  Yoshihito Nishioka (first round)
  Bjorn Fratangelo (first round)
  Gastão Elias (second round)
  Guilherme Clezar (second round)

Draw

Finals

Top half

Bottom half

References
 Main Draw
 Qualifying Draw

XIII Venice Challenge Save Cup - Singles
2015 Singles